Evan McGrath, (born January 14, 1986) is a Canadian former professional ice hockey player, who most notably played in the American Hockey League (AHL). He currently plays senior men's hockey with the Wentworth Gryphins of the Allan Cup Hockey (ACH).

Playing career
An effective offensive player with the Ontario Hockey League's Kitchener Rangers, McGrath was drafted by the Detroit Red Wings in the 4th round (128th overall) of the 2004 NHL Entry Draft. The Wings' organization regarding McGrath as a potential future power forward, though he has thus far had some difficulty adjusting to the pro game. By the end of the 2009-10 season he was reassigned to the Syracuse Crunch and was not qualified prior to free agency, allowing him to become an unrestricted free agent.

On September 17, 2010, it was announced that McGrath had signed with VIK Västerås HK of the HockeyAllsvenskan. In 2011, Evan McGrath signed with Swedish team IK Oskarshamn. And on April 18, 2013,  it was announced the McGrath had signed a contract with Frölunda HC.

He also spent the 2014–15 campaign in Sweden, again playing for VIK Västerås HK before transferring to fellow Allsvenskan team IK Oskarshamn.

The 2015–16 season saw him turn out for HC Thurgau of the National League B, the second-tier of Swiss ice hockey. He tallied 11 goals and 25 assists in 25 NLB games.

In April 2016, EC VSV of the Austrian top-flight EBEL signed McGrath for the 2016–17 season.  In his debut season with Villach, McGrath appeared in 49 games and contributed with 13 goals and 37 points. With Villach falling out of playoff contention, McGrath was not tendered a contract to remain with the club.

On July 18, 2017, McGrath was offered a contract on a try-out basis with German outfit, Adler Mannheim of the DEL, but was waived in early September 2017. He signed with German second-division side Kassel Huskies shortly after.

McGrath then played for the Sheffield Steelers of the Elite Ice Hockey League (EIHL) in the 2018–19 season. Following his one-year tenure in the U.K., McGrath announced his retirement after a professional hockey career that lasted thirteen seasons (2006 to 2019).

Personal life
McGrath is married to Maddison Gilmour, daughter of Hockey Hall of Famer Doug Gilmour.

Career statistics

Regular season and playoffs

International

Awards and honours

References

External links

1986 births
Canadian ice hockey centres
HC Davos players
Detroit Red Wings draft picks
Frölunda HC players
Grand Rapids Griffins players
Kassel Huskies players
Kitchener Rangers players
IK Oskarshamn players
Living people
People from Oakville, Ontario
Sheffield Steelers players
Syracuse Crunch players
Toledo Storm players
VIK Västerås HK players
EC VSV players
Canadian expatriate ice hockey players in Austria
Canadian expatriate ice hockey players in Germany
Canadian expatriate ice hockey players in Switzerland
Canadian expatriate ice hockey players in Sweden